Saint Mary's Redoubt, also known as Migart Redoubt, was a redoubt on the island of Comino in Malta. It was built by the Order of Saint John in 1716 or 1761 (sources vary) as one of a series of coastal fortifications around the Maltese Islands.

The redoubt was located on the northern coast of Comino, far away from the island's other defences of Saint Mary's Tower and Saint Mary's Battery. It was demolished and no traces of it can be seen today.

References

Redoubts in Malta
Hospitaller fortifications in Malta
Demolished buildings and structures in Malta
Comino
Limestone buildings in Malta
18th-century fortifications
18th Century military history of Malta